Ice hockey is one of Sweden's most popular sports and participation in women's ice hockey is increasing; the number of registered women's ice hockey players in Sweden increased from 3,425 in 2011 to 5,973 in 2020.

History
The first organized women's ice hockey game in Sweden was played in 1969 between Modo AIK and Timrå IK. The Swedish women's national team played its first games in April 1987, during the 1987 Women's World Tournament in Ontario, Canada.

The first, unofficial National Championship was played in 1985. Three unofficial championships were held, in 1984–85, 1985–86, 1986–87. The championships were played as a round-robin tournament. Nacka HK won the National Championship title in all three seasons.

The Swedish Ice Hockey Association established the first, official Swedish Championship for the 1987–88 season. Division 1 served as the qualifying league for the Swedish Championship. This league had a variable number of teams distributed into some small regional leagues, followed by a national playoff. 

During the 2007–08 season, the best Division 1 teams qualified for the new league, the Riksserien (‘National Series’), which became the top-tier league. Division 1 became the second level of women's hockey in Sweden. The Riksserien comprised eight teams. Each team would face the seven opposing teams in four games, two at home and two away. The top two teams at the end of the regular season would qualify for the semi-finals. The teams classified in third to sixth place would each play a three-game playoff qualifying series. In the semifinals , the match for the third place and final depend on a simple match. The teams ranked seventh and eighth at the end of the regular season would face the top two from Division 1 in a promotion/relegation series to remain in the Swedish Women's Hockey League or be relegated Division 1

The Riksserien was reorganized and rebranded as the Svenska damhockeyligan (SDHL, ‘Swedish Women's Hockey League‘)  prior to the 2016–17 season. The change was meant to increase public interest and sponsorship of the teams by branding the league in the style of the Swedish Hockey League (SHL) and to encourage SHL teams to promote their sister teams.

Domestic league structure

 Swedish Women's Hockey League (SDHL), organized by the Swedish Ice Hockey Association
 10 teams
 36 games in regular season
 Playoffs for top eight teams, winner is named Swedish Ice Hockey Champion
 Bottom two teams progress to qualifiers against top teams from DamEttan, relegation to DamEttan is possible
 DamEttan, organized by the Swedish Ice Hockey Association
 24 teams in the 2019–20 season, split into four geographic divisions: Södra (South), Östra (East), Norra (North), and Västra (West) 
 DamEttan Södra: 6 teams
 DamEttan Östra: 8 teams
 DamEttan Norra: 4 teams
 DamEttan Västra: 6 teams
 Number of games in regular season varies by region, from 18–28 games in 2019–20 regular season
 DamEttan Södra: 20 games
 DamEttan Östra: 28 games
 DamEttan Norra: 18 games
 DamEttan Västra: 20 games
 Playoffs for top team from each division, top two teams proceed to qualifiers against the bottom teams from SDHL, promotion to SDHL is possible
 Team finishing the regular season with the fewest points of any team in the league is relegated to DamTvåan
 DamTvåan, organized by the Swedish Ice Hockey Association
 15 teams in the 2019–20 season, split into three geographic regions: Södra (South), Västra (West), and Norra (North)
 DamTvåan Södra: 4 teams
 DamTvåan Västra: 7 teams
 DamTvåan Norra: 4 teams
 Number of games in regular season varies by region, from 6–12 games in 2019–20 regular season
 DamTvåan, Region Norr: 6 games
 DamTvåan Västra: 12 games
 DamTvåan, Region Syd: 9 games
 Team finishing the regular season with the most points of any team in the league gains promotion to DamEttan
 Various local and district-level recreational leagues, regulated by the Swedish Ice Hockey Association but generally overseen by constituent entities

Swedish Championship

Results

Notes:

All-time medal count
Updated 1 August 2020

Teams 2010-11

Riksserien 
 AIK IF
 Brynäs IF
 Leksands IF
 Linköpings HC
 MODO Hockey
 Munksund-Skuthamns SK
 Ormsta HC
 Segeltorps IF

Division I Region South A 
 Grästorp IK
 Hisingen IK
 Hovås HC/Järnbrott
 Lerums BK
 Munkedal/Stenungsund
 Trollhättan HC
 Vårgårda HC

Division I Region South B 
 Borås HC
 HV71 Queens
 IF Malmö Redhawks
 Karlskrona HK
 Motala AIF Hockey
 Rögle BK
 Växjö Lakers

Division I Region West 
 Skogsbo SK
 Hällefors/Lindlöven
 Sandviken IK
 Malungs IF
 VIK Västerås HK Ungdom
 Leksands IF 2
 Kristinehamns HT

Division I Region East 
 AIK 2
 Almtuna IS
 Järfälla HC
 Ormsta Hockey 2
 Tullinge TP
 Södertälje SK
 Segeltorps IF 2
 Västerhaninge IF

Division I Region North 
 Modo Hockey Junior
 Clemnsnäs HC
 Luleå HF
 Sundsvall Wildcats
 IF Björklöven

Tournaments
The following are IIHF tournaments that were hosted in Sweden.

See also
 Sweden women's national ice hockey team

References

Links
 swehockey.se 
 www.svenskdamhockey.se 

Women's ice hockey in Sweden